Deliverance Hobbs was accused of witchcraft during the Salem Witch Trials. She and her husband, William Hobbs, originally came from Casco, Maine, which was in Wabanaki Indian territory.

Her daughter, Abigail Hobbs, was arrested on April 18, 1692 after accusations of witchcraft. Deliverance and her husband were also arrested on suspicion of witchcraft three days later. In 1710, William Hobbs sent a petition to the General Court to pay £40 expenses that their imprisonment cost the family. Eventually, William agreed to settle for £10, which was granted to him in 1712.

References

Year of birth unknown
Year of death unknown
Place of death missing
Colonial American women
People accused of witchcraft
People from Casco, Maine
People of the Salem witch trials